Šuto Orizari (Balkan Romani: Shuto Orizari), often shortened as Šutka, is a neighbourhood in the City of Skopje, North Macedonia, and the seat of Šuto Orizari Municipality. It is often regarded as the cultural capital of the Romani people in North Macedonia.  An independent Romanistan (a state for the Romani people) was proposed here in the early 1990s by leaders of the Party for the Complete Emancipation of Roma.

Demographics
According to the 2002 census, the town had a total of 15353 inhabitants. Ethnic groups in the town include:
Arlije: 13201
Albanians: 1205
Macedonians: 481
Bosniaks: 138
Turks: 49
Serbs: 34 
Torbeshi: 245

Šuto Orizari has a mixed population that includes minorities of Muslim Romani people and Turks, yet the neighborhood is associated with Albanians in North Macedonia.

References

External links

Šuto Orizari Municipality
Neighbourhoods of Skopje
Albanian communities in North Macedonia
Romani communities in North Macedonia
Romani Muslims